In mathematics, weak bialgebras are a generalization of bialgebras that are both algebras and coalgebras but for which the compatibility conditions between the two structures have been "weakened". In the same spirit, weak Hopf algebras are weak bialgebras together with a linear map S satisfying specific conditions; they are generalizations of Hopf algebras.

These objects were introduced by Böhm, Nill and Szlachányi. The first motivations for studying them came from quantum field theory and operator algebras. Weak Hopf algebras have quite interesting representation theory; in particular modules over a semisimple finite weak Hopf algebra is a fusion category (which is a monoidal category with extra properties). It was also shown by Etingof, Nikshych and Ostrik that any fusion category is equivalent to a category of modules over a weak Hopf algebra.

Definition
A weak bialgebra  over a field  is a vector space  such that
  forms an associative algebra with multiplication  and unit ,
  forms a coassociative coalgebra with comultiplication  and counit ,
for which the following compatibility conditions hold :
 Multiplicativity of the Comultiplication : 
 ,
 Weak Multiplicativity of the Counit :
 ,
 Weak Comultiplicativity of the Unit :
 ,
where  flips the two tensor factors.

The definition weakens the compatibility between the algebra and coalgebra structures of a bialgebra. More specifically, the unit and counit are weakened. This remains true in the axioms of a weak Hopf algebra.

A weak Hopf algebra  is a weak bialgebra  with a linear map , called the antipode, that satisfies:
 ,
,
.

Examples
 Hopf algebra. Of course any Hopf algebra is a weak Hopf algebra.
 Groupoid algebra. Suppose  is a groupoid and let  be the groupoid algebra, in other words, the algebra generated by the morphisms . This becomes a weak Hopf algebra if we define
 
 
 
 
 .
Note that this second example is a weak Hopf algebra but not a Hopf algebra.

Representation theory
Let H be a semisimple finite weak Hopf algebra, then modules over H form a semisimple rigid monoidal category with finitely many simple objects. Moreover the homomorphisms spaces are finite-dimensional vector spaces and the endomorphisms space of simple objects are one-dimensional. Finally, the monoidal unit is a simple object. Such a category is called a fusion category.

It can be shown that some monoidal category are not modules over a Hopf algebra. In the case of fusion categories (which are just monoidal categories with extra conditions), it was proved by Etingof, Nikshych and Ostrik that any fusion category is equivalent to a category of modules over a weak Hopf algebra.

Notes

References

Hopf algebras